St Keverne and Meneage was an electoral division of Cornwall in the United Kingdom which returned one member to sit on Cornwall Council between 2009 and 2021. It was abolished at the 2021 local elections, being succeeded by Helston South and Meneage and Mullion and St Keverne. Julian Rand, the last councillor for the division, ran for the newly formed Helston South and Meneage, but was beaten by the Conservative candidate.

Councillors

Extent
St Keverne and Meneage represented the villages of Berepper, Gunwalloe, Cury, Gweek, Garras, Mawgan-in-Meneage, St Martin-in-Meneage, Helford, Manaccan, St Anthony-in-Meneage, Porthallow, St Keverne and Coverack, and the hamlets of Chyvarloe, White Cross, Cross Lanes, Bishop's Quay, Gillan, Tregidden, Traboe, Lanarth, Tregowris, Roskorwell, Porthoustock, Rosenithon, Trelan, Ponsongath and Gwenter.

The division was affected by boundary changes at the 2013 election. From 2009 to 2013, the division covered 10160 hectares in total; after the boundary changes in 2013, it covered 11283 hectares.

Election results

2017 election

2013 election

2009 election

References

Electoral divisions of Cornwall Council